Hyperacuity is the seventh studio album by guitarist Greg Howe, released on June 6, 2000 through Tone Center Records.

Critical reception

The staff at All About Jazz gave Hyperacuity a positive review, calling it "Howe's best release to date" and praising his guitar playing as having evolved from his previous shred-oriented releases. Paula Edelstein at AllMusic gave the album four stars out of five, describing it as an "instrumental extravaganza  fusion compositions that highlight Howe's incredible techniques and melodic flair." She listed "Blindfold Drive", "Order of Dawn", "Heat Activated", Howe's cover of Stevie Wonder's "I Wish", and the title track as highlights.

Track listing

Personnel
Greg Howe – guitar, keyboard, engineering, producer
Prashant Aswani – guitar (track 3; right stereo channel)
Kevin Soffera – drums, udu
Dale Fischer – bass

References

External links
Greg Howe "Hyperacuity" at Guitar Nine

Greg Howe albums
2000 albums
Tone Center Records albums
Albums recorded in a home studio